Bērzaune parish is an administrative unit of Madona Municipality, Latvia.

Towns, villages and settlements of Bērzaune parish 
 Bērzaune
 Dzirnaviņas
 Muižnieki
 Ozolkrogs
 Sauleskalns

External links 

Parishes of Latvia
Madona Municipality